The 1951 NBA draft was the fifth annual draft of the National Basketball Association (NBA). The draft was held on April 25, 1951, before the 1951–52 season. In this draft, ten remaining NBA teams took turns selecting amateur U.S. college basketball players. In each round, the teams select in reverse order of their win–loss record in the previous season. The Tri-Cities Blackhawks participated in the draft, but relocated to Milwaukee and became the Milwaukee Hawks prior to the start of the season. The draft consisted of 12 rounds comprising 87 players selected.

Draft selections and draftee career notes
Gene Melchiorre from Bradley University was selected first overall by the Baltimore Bullets. However, he never played in the NBA due to his involvement in a point shaving scandal while playing college basketball. Myer Skoog from University of Minnesota was selected before the draft as Minneapolis Lakers' territorial pick.

Key

Draft

Other picks
The following list includes other draft picks who have appeared in at least one NBA game.

Notable undrafted players
These players were not selected in the 1951 draft, but played at least one game in the NBA.

See also
 List of first overall NBA draft picks

References
General

Specific

External links
NBA.com
NBA.com: NBA Draft History

Draft
National Basketball Association draft
NBA draft
NBA draft
Basketball in New York City
Sporting events in New York City